Michael Fresco is an American television director and television producer.

Most notably Fresco has directed a number of episodes from shows including The O.C., My Name is Earl and the pilots to 1-800-Missing, Suburgatory, and Providence. He has also been a producer on Providence along with other shows such as Northern Exposure. He has also directed nine episodes of the series Better Off Ted (2009–10), written by his brother, Victor Fresco.

References

External links

American television directors
American television producers
Living people
Place of birth missing (living people)
Year of birth missing (living people)